Pediasia zellerella is a species of moth in the family Crambidae. It was described by Otto Staudinger in 1899. It is found in the Altai Mountains.

References

Crambini
Moths described in 1899
Moths of Asia